Jochen Breiholz is a German opera manager.

Life and career
Born in Oldenburg, Germany, Breiholz studied literature, theatre, musicology and art history at Free University of Berlin. In 1988 he did an internship at Opera News in New York City which led to an assignment as a freelance writer for the magazine. Until 2004, he worked for Opera News as a music critic, reporting mainly on the European opera scene. In 1996, Breiholz became a frequent contributor for Opernwelt magazine in Berlin. From 1997 until 2002 he worked as a writer and editor of the Arts section for the German daily newspaper Die Welt. In 2002 he moved back to New York and worked as a correspondent for several European publications, reporting on opera, classical music concerts, and theatre. He has written articles for the British magazine Opera Now, the German magazine Rondo, The Wall Street Journal Europe and the Swiss magazine Musik & Theater, among other publications. He has also worked as an interviewer for classical music radio programs. In 2005 he worked as a talent scout for a New York artists agency. He was Director of International Relations for the Latvian National Opera in Riga, Latvia, from 2006 until 2011 and also worked as dramaturg for the company. From August 2011 until March 2016 he was the Artistic Director of the Vlaamse Opera in Antwerp, Belgium. Since April 2016 he is the Director of Artistic Administration and Casting at Theater an der Wien in Vienna.

References

Living people
German music critics
Opera managers
German male non-fiction writers
Year of birth missing (living people)